The DR Class 65.10 was a four-coupled passenger train tank engine operated by the East German Deutsche Reichsbahn (DR) for heavy suburban and commuter services.

History 
 
Like the DB Class 65 built for the Deutsche Bundesbahn in West Germany, the DR Class 65.10 was intended by the  Deutsche Reichsbahn (DR) in East Germany for commuter traffic on suburban railways. The DR procured a total of 88 examples of this class, and 7 more went to the Leuna chemical works.

The Class 65.10 was developed after the Second World War as a powerful tank locomotive that would replace engines of classes 74, 75, 78, 86, 93 and 94.

Numbers 1001 and 1002 were built at VEB Lokomotivbau Elektrotechnische Werke (LEW), formerly Borsig Lokomotiv Werke (AEG), Hennigsdorf, and the production models at VEB Lokomotivbau Karl Marx, (LKM, formerly Orenstein & Koppel) Babelsberg.

Design 
The vehicles had a welded locomotive frame, a welded boiler and mixer-preheater and large tanks in order to carry additional fuel (primarily brown coal bricketts). On the Class 65.10 the two axles of the rear bogie were housed in an outer frame unlike those of their DB Class 65 counterparts.

Number 65 1004 was the only German tank engine to be equipped with a Wendler coal dust firing system which, after modifications to the design, ran perfectly well. This modification was however reversed again in 1962. From 1967 the locos were fitted with Giesl chimneys.

Use 

The 65.10s were stationed all over East Germany, except in the DR's northern locomotive depots (Bahnbetriebswerke or Bw), and in the 1960s were preferred as the motive power for commuter traffic with double-decker trains as well as on push-pull services. For the latter, engines 65 1009; 1015; 1017; 1025; 1026; 1034; 1058; 1063 and 1081 were fitted with push-pull equipment. The picture changed with the widespread appearance of the DR Class 118 diesels. The 65.10 was also used for goods train duties.

Preserved locomotives
Of the total of 95 examples produced, just three engines remain:
 65 1008 is in the former Bw Pasewalk in the care of a regional railway society.
 65 1049 is in Arnstadt (at present homed at Bw Chemnitz-Hilbersdorf).
 65 1057 is owned by the Berliner Eisenbahnfreunde (BEF).

See also 
 List of East German Deutsche Reichsbahn locomotives and railbuses
 Neubaulok
 DB Class 65

References

65.10
2-8-4T locomotives
65.10
Railway locomotives introduced in 1954
Passenger locomotives
Standard gauge locomotives of Germany
1′D2′ h2t locomotives
LEW locomotives
LKM locomotives